Polyscias is a genus of flowering plants in the family Araliaceae. They bear pinnately compound leaves.

In 2003, a checklist and nomenclator was published for Araliaceae. In this work, 116 species were listed for Polyscias.

, Plants of the World Online recognises 180 species in the genus and 22 synonyms for it.

Species

A

 Polyscias aculeata 
 Polyscias acuminata 
 Polyscias aemiliguineae 
 Polyscias aequatoguineensis 
 Polyscias aherniana 
 Polyscias albersiana 
 Polyscias alternifolia 
 Polyscias amplifolia 
 Polyscias anacardium 
 Polyscias andraerum 
 Polyscias angustifolia 
 Polyscias ariadnes 
 Polyscias ashtonii 
 Polyscias aubrevillei 
 Polyscias australiana

B

 Polyscias baehniana 
 Polyscias balansae 
 Polyscias balfouriana 
 Polyscias baretiana 
 Polyscias belensis 
 Polyscias bellendenkeriensis 
 Polyscias bernardiana 
 Polyscias bernieri 
 Polyscias biformis 
 Polyscias bipinnata 
 Polyscias bisattenuata 
 Polyscias boivinii 
 Polyscias borbonica 
 Polyscias borneensis 
 Polyscias botryophora 
 Polyscias bracteata 
 Polyscias briquetiana

C

 Polyscias carolorum 
 Polyscias cenabrei 
 Polyscias chapelieri 
 Polyscias cissiflora 
 Polyscias cissodendron 
 Polyscias collina 
 Polyscias compacta 
 Polyscias confertifolia 
 Polyscias coriacea 
 Polyscias corticata 
 Polyscias crassa 
 Polyscias crenata 
 Polyscias culminicola 
 Polyscias cumingiana 
 Polyscias cussonioides 
 Polyscias cutispongia

D

 Polyscias dichrostachya 
 Polyscias dioica 
 Polyscias diversifolia 
 Polyscias duplicata

E

 Polyscias elegans 
 Polyscias elliptica 
 Polyscias engganoense 
 Polyscias eupteronoides

F

 Polyscias farinosa 
 Polyscias felicis 
 Polyscias filicifolia 
 Polyscias floccosa 
 Polyscias florosa 
 Polyscias flynnii 
 Polyscias fraxinifolia 
 Polyscias fruticosa 
 Polyscias fulva

G

 Polyscias gracilis 
 Polyscias gruschvitzkii 
 Polyscias guilfoylei 
 Polyscias gymnocarpa

H

 Polyscias havilandii 
 Polyscias hawaiensis 
 Polyscias heineana 
 Polyscias humbertiana

J

 Polyscias jackiana 
 Polyscias jacobsii 
 Polyscias javanica 
 Polyscias joskei

K

 Polyscias kalabenonensis 
 Polyscias kavaiensis 
 Polyscias kikuyuensis 
 Polyscias kivuensis 
 Polyscias kjellbergii 
 Polyscias koordersii

L

 Polyscias lancifolia 
 Polyscias lantzii 
 Polyscias lanutoensis 
 Polyscias leandriana 
 Polyscias lecardii 
 Polyscias ledermannii 
 Polyscias letestui 
 Polyscias lionnetii 
 Polyscias lydgatei

M

 Polyscias macgillivrayi 
 Polyscias mackeei 
 Polyscias macrantha 
 Polyscias macrocarpa 
 Polyscias madagascariensis 
 Polyscias maraisiana 
 Polyscias maralia 
 Polyscias marchionensis 
 Polyscias mauritiana 
 Polyscias mayottensis 
 Polyscias meliifolia 
 Polyscias microbotrys 
 Polyscias mollis 
 Polyscias montana 
 Polyscias multibracteata 
 Polyscias multijuga 
 Polyscias muraltana 
 Polyscias murrayi 
 Polyscias myrsine

N

 Polyscias neraudiana 
 Polyscias nodosa 
 Polyscias nossibiensis

O

 Polyscias oahuensis 
 Polyscias obtusifolia 
 Polyscias ornifolia 
 Polyscias otopyrena

P

 Polyscias pachypedicellata 
 Polyscias pacifica 
 Polyscias palmervandenbroekii 
 Polyscias pancheri 
 Polyscias paniculata 
 Polyscias papuana 
 Polyscias papyracea 
 Polyscias paucidens 
 Polyscias pentamera 
 Polyscias philippinensis 
 Polyscias philipsonii 
 Polyscias pinnata 
 Polyscias pleiosperma 
 Polyscias prolifera 
 Polyscias pulgarensis 
 Polyscias purpurea

Q

 Polyscias quintasii

R

 Polyscias rainaliorum 
 Polyscias reineckei 
 Polyscias repanda 
 Polyscias revoluta 
 Polyscias richardsiae 
 Polyscias rivalsii 
 Polyscias rodriguesiana 
 Polyscias roemeriana 
 Polyscias royenii 
 Polyscias rubiginosa 
 Polyscias rufosepala

S

 Polyscias sambucifolia 
 Polyscias samoensis 
 Polyscias sandwicensis 
 Polyscias schmidii 
 Polyscias schultzei 
 Polyscias scopoliae 
 Polyscias scutellaria 
 Polyscias sechellarum 
 Polyscias serratifolia 
 Polyscias sessiliflora 
 Polyscias sleumeri 
 Polyscias solomonensis 
 Polyscias sorongensis 
 Polyscias spectabilis 
 Polyscias stonei 
 Polyscias stuhlmannii 
 Polyscias subcapitata

T

 Polyscias tafondroensis 
 Polyscias tahitensis 
 Polyscias terminalia 
 Polyscias thailandica 
 Polyscias tripinnata

V

 Polyscias verrucosa 
 Polyscias verticillata 
 Polyscias vieillardii 
 Polyscias vogelkopensis

W

 Polyscias waialealae 
 Polyscias waimeae 
 Polyscias weinmanniae 
 Polyscias willmottii 
 Polyscias winkleri 
 Polyscias wohlhauseri

Z

 Polyscias zanthoxyloides 
 Polyscias zippeliana

References

External links

 
Apiales genera